The Mantiqueira Mosaic is a protected area mosaic that contains conservation units in the states of Rio de Janeiro, São Paulo and Minas Gerais, Brazil. The conservation units are of different types and are managed at the federal, state or municipal level. The mosaic provides a level of integrated and coordinated management.

Location

The Serra da Mantiqueira is one of the largest of the mountain ranges of southeastern Brazil, extending over parts of the states of São Paulo, Rio de Janeiro and Minas Gerais. 
These states produce half the gross domestic product (GDP) of Brazil.
The range contains Atlantic Forest vegetation of great ecological importance, including meadows, forest and enclaves of Araucaria forest. 
It supplies water to rivers including the Paraná, Verde, Grande, Jaguari River, Sapucaí, Sapucaí-Mirim and Paraíba do Sul.
These are important sources of water for the metropolitan region of São Paulo and most of the state of Rio de Janeiro.

History

A project to create three new protected area mosaics in the Serra do Mar Ecological Corridor began in December 2005, coordinated by the National Council of the Atlantic Forest Biosphere Reserve.
These were the Bocaina Mosaic, Central Rio de Janeiro Atlantic Forest Mosaic and Mantiqueira Mosaic.
Funding was provided by Conservation International, the Fund for the Global Environment Facility (GEF), the Government of Japan, the MacArthur Foundation and the World Bank.

The Mantiqueira Mosaic was created by decree 351 of 11 December 2006.
The Ministry of the Environment gave the mosaics formal structure in March 2007.
Their purpose is to give integrated management of different conservation units in a region, including federal, state, municipal and private units, which may be different form of strictly protected or sustainable use unit.

The conservation units within the mosaic are in different stages of development.
The fully protected areas are making progress to completing the land regularization process, where the titles of former owners are transferred to the state after compensation.
Most of the units have consultative councils, but only a few have developed detailed management plans.
The consultative council of the mosaic is composed of managers of the component units, some of whom represent more than one unit, and representatives of civil society.

Extent

The mosaic includes 17 public conservation units and several private natural heritage reserves.
Conservation units include:

Notes

Sources

Protected area mosaics of Brazil
Protected areas of Rio de Janeiro (state)
Protected areas of São Paulo (state)
Protected areas of Minas Gerais
2006 establishments in Brazil